Phyllonorycter hibiscina is a moth of the family Gracillariidae. It is known from South Africa, Kenya, Zimbabwe and Cameroon. The habitat consists of secondary forests.

The length of the forewings is 3–4.1 mm. The forewings are ochreous dark golden with white markings. The hindwings are pale fuscous with a long, pale fuscous fringe. Adults are on wing almost year-round except in June, July and August.

The larvae feed on Brachylaena, Abutilon mauritianum, Hibiscus calyphyllus, Hibiscus lunarifolius and Pavonia. They mine the leaves of their host plant. The mine has the form of a moderate, oval or oblong, semi-transparent, tentiform mine on the underside of the leaf.

References

Moths described in 1961
hibiscina
Moths of Africa